In algebraic geometry, the  Barth–Nieto quintic is a quintic 3-fold in 4 (or sometimes 5) dimensional projective space studied by  that is the Hessian of the Segre cubic.

Definition
The Barth–Nieto quintic is the closure of the set of points (x0:x1:x2:x3:x4:x5) of P5 satisfying the equations

Properties
The Barth–Nieto quintic is not rational, but has a smooth model that is a modular Calabi–Yau manifold with Kodaira dimension zero. Furthermore, it is birationally equivalent to a compactification of the Siegel modular variety A1,3(2).

References

3-folds